Lake Šas is a lake located north-east of Ulcinj, near the village of Šas, in Montenegro. It is bordered geographically by Briska Gora (Mali i Brisë) to the southwest, Fraskanjelsko Polje (Këneta e Fraskanjellit) to the east, Ambulsko Brdo (Mali i Amullit) and Šasko Brdo (Mali i Shasit) to the northeast and the Brisko Polje (Fusha e Brisë) to the northwest. Geopolitically, Briska Gora lies to the southwest of Lake Šas, Fraskanjel lies to the east and Ambula and Šas to the northeast. The area of this lake is 5.5 km², it is 3.2 km long and 1.5 km wide. The max depth is 7.8 m. The shore of the lake is about 8.6 km.

It is also known as Little Lake Skadar  because it has the same flora and fauna as Lake Skadar, which is much larger in size than Lake Šas. In warmer months, the lake is populated with large numbers of different bird species.

Fauna 
List of bird species that have been found in Lake Šas:
 Pelecanus crispus
 Podiceps cristatus
 Tachybaptus ruficollis
 Microcarbo pygmeus
 Egretta garzetta
 Ardeola ralloides
 Platalea leucorodia
 Botaurus stellaris
 Anas platyrhynchos
 Larus cachinnans
 Sterna caspia
 Fulica atra

See also 
Lake Skadar
Bojana (river)
Ulcinj

References

Ulcinj Municipality
Sas